The 1976 Rover 500K was an endurance race for Group C Touring Cars. The race was held at the Phillip Island Grand Prix Circuit in Victoria, Australia on 28 November 1976 over 106 laps, totalling 501.4 kilometres. The Rover 500K was Round 4 of the 1976 Australian Championship of Makes and Round 11 of the 1976 Australian Touring Car Championship. It was the sixth "Phillip Island 500K" race to be held.

The race was notable for being Colin Bond's last drive for the Holden Dealer Team after more than seven years in their lineup. Bond won the race from Charlie O'Brien, the driver who would replace him in 1977. In a generally poorly attended entry the pair finished four laps ahead of Peter Janson, providing a clean sweep of the podium positions for Holden Torana drivers.

Class structure
Cars competed in four classes, defined by the engine capacity.
Class A : Up to 1300cc
Class B : 1301–2000cc
Class C : 2001 – 3000cc
Class D : Over 3000cc

Results
Results were as follows:

Note: The event was contested by a 43 car field.

References

Phillip Island 500
Rover 500K
Motorsport at Phillip Island
November 1976 sports events in Australia